The Walter and Mary Ellen Rudin House is a Frank Lloyd Wright-designed Marshall Erdman prefab building located at 110 Marinette Trail, Madison, Wisconsin. Designed in 1957, it is the first of the only two examples of the second type (known as Prefab #2) of the Marshall Erdman Prefab Houses. This house and the James McBean Residence have the same floor plan and vary only in minor details such as paint color and siting. Construction was completed in June, 1959 and the house was sold to UW-Madison mathematicians Walter and Mary Ellen Rudin. 

The house has a large, square 2-story living room which is lit by a wall of windows. Also on the first floor are the dining area, kitchen, entry hall, utility room, and the master bedroom. A large concrete block fireplace separates the kitchen and living room. A stairway leads to a balcony and three second-story bedrooms.  Unusual for a Wright-designed house, it has a full basement.

The house is constructed from concrete block with horizontal board and batten siding. A row of windows just below the soffit make the chunky flat cantilevered roof appear to float above the house. A carport attached to one corner of the house completes the design.

References

 Storrer, William Allin. The Frank Lloyd Wright Companion. University Of Chicago Press, 2006,  (S.412.1)

External links
 Mary Ellen and Walter Rudin Residence
 Wright in Wisconsin
 Exterior photographs of the Rudin Residence

Frank Lloyd Wright buildings
Houses in Madison, Wisconsin
Houses completed in 1959